Saint Patrick's Seminary and University in Menlo Park, California is a Roman Catholic post-graduate seminary whose primary mission is the formation of clergy for Western and Pacific Rim dioceses. It is located on a historic, beautifully landscaped 40 acre campus in Menlo Park, California, 35 miles south of San Francisco, in the heart of Silicon Valley. Since its founding, on September 20, 1898, by San Francisco Archbishop Patrick William Riordan, with a faculty from the Sulpician order and thirty-four young men, the seminary and university has grown considerably. In over 100-years, it has formed more than 2,000 priests. This school is governed by the Archdiocese of San Francisco in association with its other sponsoring western and Pacific Rim dioceses.

The Archbishop of San Francisco, Most Reverend Salvatore J. Cordileone, serves as the President and Chancellor of the Seminary and University. The  President-Rector is Very Rev. Mark D. Doherty. The seminary and university is fully accredited as a graduate educational institution by the Association of Theological Schools in the United States and Canada, the Western Association of Schools and Colleges, and the Congregation for Catholic Education in Rome. In the Spring 2022 semester, the seminary had an enrollment of 62 men, representing 11 dioceses and religious orders.

History

The second Archbishop of San Francisco, Archbishop Patrick William Riordan established St Patrick's Seminary in Menlo Park in 1898, in cooperation with the Society of Saint Sulpice—a French-based order of priests dedicated to educating (forming) future priests. To thank the generous Irish laypersons and clergy who helped to fund and support the Seminary, Riordan named it in honor of Saint Patrick of Armagh, the Apostle of Ireland. By this time, the Sulpician order had committed five priests, three Frenchmen and two Americans to staff the seminary. The first rector was Rev. Father Jean-Baptiste Vuibert, S.S. On August 24, 1898, the seminary was solemnly dedicated by Riordan, joined by Bishops George Montgomery of Los Angeles and Thomas Grace of Sacramento, along with more than 100 clergy. On September 20, 1898 the seminary received 31 high school students and 3 college-level students. The first annual commencement exercises took place on May 31, 1899 and were presided over by Riordan. As the seminary continued to develop, a Department of Philosophy was established with six students. In 1903, the Little Sisters of the Holy Family arrived from Sherbrooke, Quebec, Canada, to take care of the domestic services such as cooking, laundry and cleaning.  They have since returned to Canada due to a lack of religious vocations, but currently working in their stead are the Oblates of Jesus the Priest.

The Society of Saint Sulpice withdrew completely from St. Patrick's Seminary & University on June 30, 2017.

Clerical formation

Students are admitted to Saint Patrick Seminary on the recommendation of their diocesan bishop after intensive psychological testing and rigorous interviews. The program consists of four years of spiritual, academic and pastoral formation in residence. Following the second year of studies, a candidate undergoes a year of intensively supervised pastoral experience. Normally, a candidate is called to the diaconate by his bishop in the fall semester of his last year, to serve in a local parish for the remainder of that year before being called to the presbyterate.

All candidates undergo formation which includes daily participation in the Liturgy of the Hours and the Eucharist, as well as spiritual exercises and special devotions. For continued studies at Saint Patrick's, all candidates must conform to the standards of moral and academic fitness required by the seminary in accordance with its directives and prescriptions for its program of priestly formation. Candidates deemed unsuitable for seminary life or for the priesthood are either put on probation or dismissed outright from the seminary community.

Notable alumni or staff

Notable alumni and staff include:

References

External links
 Seminary rector wants priests who can dialogue, evangelize (February 3, 2005).
St. Patrick Seminary official website

Roman Catholic Archdiocese of San Francisco
Catholic seminaries in the United States
Seminaries and theological colleges in California
Universities and colleges in San Mateo County, California
Educational institutions established in 1898
1898 establishments in California
Menlo Park, California
Society of the Priests of Saint Sulpice